Lisa Black may refer to:

 Lisa Black (rhythmic gymnast) (born 1967), British rhythmic gymnast
 Lisa Black (sculptor) (born 1982), New Zealand sculptor and jeweller
 Lisa Hartman Black (born 1956), American actress and singer

See also
 Lisa (rapper), member of Blackpink